Old State Road Bridge is a historic Pratt Pony Truss bridge over the Ausable River at AuSable Chasm and Chesterfield in Clinton and Essex County, New York.  It was built in 1890.  The bridge is 107 feet (32.6 m) in length, 23 feet (7 m) wide, and 10 feet (3 m) in height.

It was listed on the National Register of Historic Places in 1999.

References

Road bridges on the National Register of Historic Places in New York (state)
Bridges completed in 1890
Bridges in Clinton County, New York
Bridges in Essex County, New York
National Register of Historic Places in Clinton County, New York
National Register of Historic Places in Essex County, New York
Pratt truss bridges in the United States